The Women's National Basketball Association Finals Most Valuable Player (MVP) is an annual Women's National Basketball Association (WNBA) award given since the league's inaugural season.

During the first four years of the league, the Houston Comets' Cynthia Cooper won the award four consecutive times. The Los Angeles Sparks' Lisa Leslie won back-to-back in the subsequent two seasons. No other players have won the award in consecutive seasons, but Diana Taurasi, Sylvia Fowles, and Breanna Stewart have won the award twice. While some teams have won multiple championship since the dynasty years of the Comets and the Sparks, the match-up usually resulted in different MVPs. For example, in the Detroit Shock's three wins over six years, three different players won the award. As of 2021, there have been two non-American Finals MVPs – Lauren Jackson of Australia (2010) and Emma Meesseman of Belgium (2019).

Winners

Multi-time winners

See also

 List of sports awards honoring women

Footnotes

References
 

Awards established in 1997
Most Vaulable Player Award
Finals Most Valuable Player Award